Alexandra David-Néel (born Louise Eugénie Alexandrine Marie David; 24 October 1868 – 8 September 1969) was a Belgian–French explorer, spiritualist, Buddhist, anarchist, opera singer, and writer. She is most known for her 1924 visit to Lhasa, Tibet, when it was forbidden to foreigners. David-Néel wrote over 30 books about Eastern religion, philosophy, and her travels, including Magic and Mystery in Tibet, which was published in 1929. Her teachings influenced the beat writers Jack Kerouac and Allen Ginsberg, the popularisers of Eastern philosophy Alan Watts and Ram Dass, and the esotericist Benjamin Creme.

Biography

Early life and background

In 1871, when David-Néel was two years old, her father Louis David, appalled by the execution of the last Communards, took her to see the Communards' Wall at the Père-Lachaise cemetery in Paris; she never forgot this early encounter with the face of death, from which she first learned of the ferocity of humans. Two years later, the Davids emigrated to Belgium.

Since before the age of 15, she had been exercising a good number of extravagant austerities: fasting, corporal torments, recipes drawn from biographies of ascetic saints found in the library of one of her female relatives, to which she refers to in Sous des nuées d'orage, published in 1940.

At the age of 15, spending her holidays with her parents at Ostend, she ran away and reached the port of Vlissingen in the Netherlands to try and embark for England. Lack of money forced her to give up.

At the age of 18, David-Néel had already visited England, Switzerland and Spain on her own, and she was studying in Madame Blavatsky's Theosophical Society. "She joined various secret societies – she would reach the thirtieth degree in the mixed Scottish Rite of Freemasonry – while feminist and anarchist groups greeted her with enthusiasm... Throughout her childhood and adolescence, she was associated with the French geographer and anarchist Elisée Reclus (1820–1905). This led her to become interested in the anarchistic ideas of the time and in feminism, that inspired her to publish Pour la vie (For Life) in 1898. In 1899, she composed an anarchist treatise with a preface by Elisée Reclus. Publishers did not dare to publish the book, though her friend Jean Haustont printed copies himself and it was eventually translated into five languages." In 1891, she visited India for the first time, and met her spiritual preceptor, Swami Bhaskarananda Saraswati of Varanasi.

According to Raymond Brodeur, she converted to Buddhism in 1889, which she noted in her diary that was published under the title La Lampe de sagesse (The Lamp of Wisdom) in 1896. She was 21 years old. That same year, to refine her English, an indispensable language for an orientalist's career, she went to London where she frequented the library of the British Museum, and met several members of the Theosophical Society. The following year, back in Paris, she introduced herself to Sanskrit and Tibetan and followed different instructions at the Collège de France and at the Ecole pratique des hautes Etudes (practical school of advanced studies) without ever passing an exam there. According to Jean Chalon, her vocation to be an orientalist and Buddhist originated at the Guimet Museum.

1895–1904: Opera singer
At the suggestion of her father, David-Néel attended the Conservatoire royal de Bruxelles (Royal Conservatory of Brussels), where she studied piano and singing. To help her parents who were experiencing setbacks, David-Néel, who had obtained a first prize for singing, took the position of first singer at the Hanoi Opera House (Indochina) during the seasons 1895–1896 and 1896–1897 under the name Alexandra Myrial.

She interpreted the role of the Violetta in La Traviata (by Verdi), then she sang in Les Noces de Jeannette (by Victor Massé), in Faust and in Mireille (by Gounod), Lakmé (by Léo Delibes), Carmen (by Bizet), and Thaïs (by Massenet). She maintained a pen friendship with Frédéric Mistral and Jules Massenet at that time.

From 1897 to 1900, she was living together with the pianist Jean Haustont in Paris, writing Lidia with him, a lyric tragedy in one act, for which Haustont composed the music and David-Néel the libretto. She left to sing at the opera of Athens from November 1899 to January 1900. Then, in July of the same year, she went to the opera of Tunis. Soon after her arrival in the city, she met a distant cousin, Philippe Néel, chief engineer of the Tunisian railways and her future husband. During a stay of Jean Haustont in Tunis in the Summer of 1902, she gave up her singing career and assumed artistic direction of the casino of Tunis for a few months, while continuing her intellectual work.

1904–1911: Marriage
On 4 August 1904, at age 36, she married Philippe Néel de Saint-Sauveur, whose lover she had been since 15 September 1900. Their life together was sometimes turbulent but characterized by mutual respect. It was interrupted by her departure, alone, for her third trip to India (1911–1925) (the second one was carried out for a singing tour) on 9 August 1911. She did not want children, aware that motherhood was incompatible with her need of independence and her inclination to education. She promised to  return to Philippe in nineteen months, but it was fourteen years later, in May 1925, when they met again, separating after some days. David-Néel had come back with her exploration partner, the young Lama Aphur Yongden, whom she would make her adopted son in 1929. Legend has it that her husband was also her patron. The truth is probably quite different. She had, at her marriage, her own personal fortune.

During that time, she wrote for journals and lectured about controversial subjects in the cities of Europe. She advocated in favour of Buddhism, Zionism and radical feminism. Her marriage started to unravel, as her travels kept her apart from her husband.

1911–1925: The Indo-Tibetan expedition

Arrival in Sikkim (1912)
Alexandra David-Néel traveled for the second time to India to further her study of Buddhism. In 1912, she arrived at the royal monastery of Sikkim, where she befriended Maharaj Kumar (crown prince) Sidkeong Tulku Namgyal, the eldest son of the sovereign (Chogyal) of this kingdom (which would become a state of India), and traveled in many Buddhist monasteries to improve her knowledge of Buddhism. In 1914, she met young Aphur Yongden in one of these monasteries, 15 years old, whom she would later adopt as her son.

Sidkeong, then the spiritual leader of Sikkim, was sent to the meeting with Alexandra David-Néel by his father, the Maharaja of Sikkim, having been told about her arrival in April 1912 by the British resident at Gangtok. On the occasion of this first encounter, their mutual understanding was immediate: Sidkeong, eager for reformation, was listening to Alexandra David-Néel's advice, and before returning to his occupations, he left behind the Lama Kazi Dawa Samdup as a guide, interpreter and professor of Tibetan. After that, Sidkeong confided in Alexandra David-Néel that his father wished for him to renounce the throne in favor of his half-brother.

Meeting with the 13th Dalai Lama in Kalimpong (1912)
Lama Kazi Dawa Samdup accompanied Alexandra David-Néel to Kalimpong, where she met with the 13th Dalai Lama in exile. She received an audience on 15 April 1912, and met Ekai Kawaguchi in his waiting room, whom she would meet again in Japan. The Dalai Lama welcomed her, accompanied by the inevitable interpreter, and he strongly advised her to learn Tibetan, an advice she followed. She received his blessing, then the Dalai Lama engaged the dialogue, asking her how she had become a Buddhist. David-Néel amused him by claiming to be the only Buddhist in Paris, and surprised him by telling him that the Gyatcher Rolpa, a sacred Tibetan book, had been translated by Phillippe-Édouard Foucaux, a professor at the Collège de France. She asked for many additional explanations that the Dalai Lama tried to provide, promising to answer all her questions in writing.

Stay at Lachen (1912–1916)
In late May, she went to Lachen, where she met Lachen Gomchen Rinpoche, the superior (gomchen) of the town's monastery, with the improvised interpreter M. Owen (E. H. Owen), a reverend who replaced the absent Kazi Dawa Samdup. In Lachen, she lived for several years close to one of the greatest gomchens of whom she had the privilege to be taught, and above all, she was very close to the Tibetan border, which she crossed twice against all odds.

In her anchorite cave, she practiced Tibetan yoga. She was sometimes in tsam, that is to retreat for several days without seeing anyone, and she learned the technique of tummo, which mobilized her internal energy to produce heat. As a result of this apprenticeship, her master, the Gomchen of Lachen, gave her the religious name of Yeshe Tome, "Lamp of Wisdom", which proved valuable to her because she was then known by Buddhist authorities everywhere she went in Asia.

While she was in company of Lachen Gomchen Rinpoche, Alexandra David-Néel encountered Sidkeong again on an inspection tour in Lachen on 29 May 1912. These three personalities of Buddhism, thus reunited, reflected and worked together to reform and expand Buddhism, as the Gomchen would declare.

There was correspondence between Sidkeong and Alexandra David-Néel. In a letter by Sidkeong written at Gangtok on 8 October 1912, he thanked her for the meditation method she had sent him. On 9 October, he accompanied her to Darjeeling, where they visited a monastery together, while she prepared to return to Calcutta. In another letter, Sidkeong informed David-Néel that, in March 1913, he was able to enter Freemasonry at Calcutta, where he had been admitted as a member, provided with a letter of introduction by the governor of Bengal, a further link between them. He told her of his pleasure of having been allowed to become a member of this society.

When his father was about to die, Sidkeong called Alexandra David-Néel for help, and asked her for advice in bringing about the reform of Buddhism that he wished to implement at Sikkim once he came to power. Returning to Gangtok via Darjeeling and Siliguri, David-Néel was received like an official figure, with guard of honor, by Sidkeong on 3 December 1913.

On 4 January 1914, he gave her, as a gift for the new year, a lamani's (female lama) dress sanctified according to the Buddhist rites. David-Néel had her picture taken with a yellow hat completing the ensemble.

On 10 February 1914, the Maharaja died, and Sidkeong succeeded him. The campaign of religious reform could begin, Kali Koumar, a monk of southern Buddhism was called to participate in it, as well as Sīlācāra (an Englishman) who was then living in Burma. Ma Lat (Hteiktin Ma Lat) came from that same country, David-Néel was in correspondence with her, and Sidkeong married Ma Lat, with Alexandra David-Néel becoming the Maharaja's marriage counselor.

While she was at the monastery of Phodong, the abbot of which was Sidkeong, David-Néel declared she heard a voice announcing to her that the reforms would fail.

On 11 November 1914, leaving the cavern of Sikkim where she had gone to meet the gomchen, David-Néel was received at Lachen Monastery by Sidkeong. One month later, she learned about Sidkeong's sudden death, news that affected her and made her think of poisoning.

First trip to Tibet and meeting with the Panchen Lama (1916)
On 13 July 1916, without asking for permission, Alexandra David-Néel left for Tibet, accompanied by Yongden and a monk. She planned to visit two great religious centers close to her Sikkim retreat: the monastery of Chorten Nyima and Tashilhunpo Monastery, close to Shigatse, one of the biggest cities of southern Tibet. At the monastery of Tashilhunpo, where she arrived on 16 July, she was allowed to consult the Buddhist scriptures and visit various temples. On the 19th, she met with the Panchen Lama, by whom she received blessings and a charming welcome: he introduced her to his entourage's persons of rank, to his professors, and to his mother (with whom David-Néel tied bonds of friendship and who suggested to her to reside in a convent). The Panchen Lama bade and proposed her to stay at Shigatse as his guest, what she declined, leaving the town on 26 July, not without having received the honorary titles of a Lama and a doctor in Tibetan Buddhism and having experienced hours of great bliss.

Upon her return to Sikkim, the British colonial authorities, pushed by missionaries exasperated by the welcome afforded David-Néel by the Panchen Lama and annoyed by her having ignored their ban of entering Tibet, informed her that she was to be deported for violating the no-entry edict.

Trip to Japan, Korea, China, Mongolia, and Tibet
As it was impossible to return to Europe during World War I, Alexandra David-Néel and Yongden left Sikkim for India and then Japan. There she met the philosopher Ekai Kawaguchi who had managed to stay for eighteen months in Lhasa as a Chinese monk in disguise a few years earlier. David-Néel and Yongden subsequently left for Korea and then Beijing, China. From there, they chose to cross China from east to west, accompanied by a colourful Tibetan Lama. Their journey took several years through the Gobi, Mongolia, before a break of three years (1918–1921) at Kumbum Monastery in Tibet, where David-Néel, helped by Yongden, translated the famous Prajnaparamita.

Incognito stay in Lhasa (1924)
 
Disguised as a beggar and a monk, respectively, and carrying a backpack as discreet as possible, Alexandra David-Néel and Yongden then left for the Forbidden City. In order not to betray her status as a foreigner, David-Néel did not dare to take a camera and survey equipment, she hid, however, under her rags a compass, a pistol, and a purse with money for a possible ransom. Finally, they reached Lhasa in 1924, merged with a crowd of pilgrims coming to celebrate the Monlam Prayer Festival. They stayed in Lhasa for two months visiting the holy city and the large surrounding monasteries: Drepung, Sera, Ganden, Samye, and met Swami Asuri Kapila (Cesar Della Rosa Bendio). Foster Stockwell pointed out that neither the Dalai Lama nor his assistants welcomed David-Néel, that she was neither shown the treasures of lamasery nor awarded a diploma. Jacques Brosse states more precisely that she knew the Dalai Lama well, but he didn't know that she was in Lhasa and she could not reveal her identity. She found "nothing very special" in Potala, of which she remarked that the interior design was "entirely Chinese-style". Despite her face smeared with soot, her yak wool mats, and her traditional fur hat, she was finally unmasked (due to too much cleanliness – she went to wash herself every morning at the river) and denounced to Tsarong Shape, the Governor of Lhasa. By the time the latter took action, David-Néel and Yongden had already left Lhasa for Gyantse. They were told about the story only later, by letters of Ludlow and David Macdonald (the British sales representative in Gyantse).

In May 1924, the explorer, exhausted, "without money and in rags", was accommodated together with her companion at the Macdonald home for a fortnight. She managed to reach Northern India through Sikkim thanks partly to the 500 rupees she borrowed from Macdonald and to the necessary papers that he and his son-in-law, captain Perry, obtained for her. In Calcutta, dressed in the new Tibetan outfit Macdonald had bought for her, she got herself photographed in a studio.

After her return, starting at her arrival at Havre on May 10, 1925, she was able to assess the remarkable fame her audacity had earned her. She hit the headlines of the newspapers and her portrait spread in the magazines. The account of her adventure would become the subject of a book, My Journey to Lhasa, which was published in Paris, London and New York in 1927, but met with disbelief of critics who had a hard time accepting the stories about such practices as levitation and tummo (the increase of body temperature to withstand cold).

In 1972, Jeanne Denys, who was at one time working as a librarian for David-Néel, would publish Alexandra David-Néel au Tibet: une supercherie dévoilée (approximately: Alexandra David-Neel in Tibet: trickery uncovered), a book which caused rather little sensation by claiming to demonstrate that David-Néel had not entered Lhasa. Jeanne Denys maintained that the photograph of David-Néel and Aphur sitting in the area before the Potala, taken by Tibetan friends, was a montage. She pretended that David-Néel's parents were modest Jewish storekeepers who spoke Yiddish at home. She went as far as to accuse David-Néel of having invented the accounts of her voyages and of her studies.

1925–1937: The European interlude
Back in France, Alexandra David-Néel rented a small house in the hills of Toulon and was looking for a home in the sun and without too many neighbors. An agency from Marseille suggested a small house in Digne-les-Bains (Provence) to her in 1928. She, who was looking for the sun, visited the house during a rainstorm, but she liked the place and she bought it. Four years later, she began to enlarge the house, called Samten-Dzong or "fortress of meditation", the first hermitage and Lamaist shrine in France according to Raymond Brodeur. There she wrote several books describing her various trips. In 1929, she published her most famous and beloved work, Mystiques et Magiciens du Tibet (Magicians and Mystics in Tibet).

1937–1946: Chinese journey and Tibetan retreat
In 1937, aged sixty-nine, Alexandra David-Néel decided to leave for China with Yongden via Brussels, Moscow and the Trans-Siberian Railway. Her aim was to study ancient Taoism.  She found herself in the middle of the Second Sino-Japanese War and attended the horrors of war, famine and epidemics. Fleeing the combat, she wandered through China on a shoestring budget. The Chinese journey took course during one and a half years between Beijing, Mount Wutai, Hankou and Chengdu. On 4 June 1938, she went back to the Tibetan town of Tachienlu for a retreat of five years. She was deeply touched by the announcement of the death of her husband in 1941.

One minor mystery relating to Alexandra David-Néel has a solution. In Forbidden Journey, p. 284, the authors wonder how Mme. David-Néel's secretary, Violet Sydney, made her way back to the West in 1939 after Sous des nuées d'orage (Storm Clouds) was completed in Tachienlu. Peter Goullart's Land of the Lamas (not in Forbidden Journey'''s bibliography), on pp. 110–113 gives an account of his accompanying Ms. Sydney partway back, then putting her under the care of Lolo bandits to continue the journey to Chengdu. While in Eastern Tibet David-Néel and Yongden completed circumambulation of the holy mountain Amnye Machen.
In 1945, Alexandra David-Néel went back to India thanks to Christian Fouchet, French Consul at Calcutta, who became a friend; they stayed in touch until David-Néel's death. She finally left Asia with Aphur Yongden by airplane, departing from Calcutta in June 1946. On 1 July, they arrived at Paris, where they stayed until October, when they went back to Digne-les-Bains.

1946–1969: the Lady of Digne
At 78, Alexandra David-Néel returned to France to arrange the estate of her husband, then she started writing from her home in Digne.

Between 1947 and 1950, Alexandra David-Néel came across Paul Adam – Venerable Aryadeva, she commended him because he took her place on short notice, at a conference held at the Theosophical Society in Paris.

In 1952, she published the Textes tibétains inédits ("unpublished Tibetan writings"), an anthology of Tibetan literature including, among other things, the erotic poems attributed to the 6th Dalai Lama. In 1953, a newspiece followed, Le vieux Tibet face à la Chine nouvelle, in which she gave "a  certain and documented opinion" on the tense situation in the regions once visited by her.

She went through the pain of suddenly losing Yongden on 7 October 1955. According to Jacques Brosse, Yongden, seized by a strong fever and sickness, which David-Néel attributed to a simple indigestion, fell into a coma during the night and died carried off by kidney failure according to the doctor's diagnosis. Just having turned 87, David-Néel found herself alone. Yongden's ashes were kept safe in the Tibetan oratory of Samten Dzong, awaiting to be thrown into the Ganges, together with those of David-Néel after her death.

With age, David-Néel suffered more and more from articular rheumatism that forced her to walk with crutches. "I walk on my arms", she used to say. Her work rhythm slowed down: she didn't publish anything in 1955 and 1956, and, in 1957, only the third edition of the Initiations lamaïques.

In April 1957, she left Samten Dzong in order to live at Monaco with a friend who had typed her manuscripts. She decided to live alone in a hotel, going from one establishment to the next, until June 1959, when she was introduced to a young woman, Marie-Madeleine Peyronnet, who she took as her personal secretary. She would stay with the old lady until the end, "watching over her like a daughter over her mother – and sometimes like a mother over her unbearable child – but also like a disciple at the service of her guru", according to the words of Jacques Brosse.

Legacy
In 1925, she won the Award Monique Berlioux of the Académie des sports. Although she was not a sportswoman in a strict sense, she is part of the list of the 287 Gloires du sport français (English: Glories of French sport).

In 2006, Priscilla Telmon paid tribute to Alexandra David-Néel through an expedition on foot and alone across the Himalaya. She recounted her predecessor's journey from Vietnam to Calcutta via Lhasa. A movie, Au Tibet Interdit (English: Into Forbidden Tibet), was shot on that expedition.

 Bibliography 
1898 Pour la vie1911 Le modernisme bouddhiste et le bouddhisme du Bouddha1927 Voyage d'une Parisienne à Lhassa (1927, My Journey to Lhasa)
1929 Mystiques et Magiciens du Tibet (1929, Magic and Mystery in Tibet)
1930 Initiations Lamaïques (Initiations and Initiates in Tibet)
1931 La vie Surhumaine de Guésar de Ling le Héros Thibétain (The Superhuman Life of Gesar of Ling)
1933 Grand Tibet; Au pays des brigands-gentilshommes1935 Le lama au cinq sagesses1938 Magie d'amour et magic noire; Scènes du Tibet inconnu (Tibetan Tale of Love and Magic)
1939 Buddhism: Its Doctrines and Its Methods1940 Sous des nuées d'orage; Récit de voyage1949 Au coeur des Himalayas; Le Népal1951 Ashtavakra Gita; Discours sur le Vedanta Advaita1951 Les Enseignements Secrets des Bouddhistes Tibétains (The Secret Oral Teachings in Tibetan Buddhist Sects)
1951 L'Inde hier, aujourd'hui, demain1952 Textes tibétains inédits1953 Le vieux Tibet face à la Chine nouvelle1954 La puissance de néant, by Lama Yongden (The Power of Nothingness)Grammaire de la langue tibétaine parlée1958 Avadhuta Gita1958 La connaissance transcendente1961 Immortalité et réincarnation: Doctrines et pratiques en Chine, au Tibet, dans l'IndeL'Inde où j'ai vecu; Avant et après l'indépendence1964 Quarante siècles d'expansion chinoise1970 En Chine: L'amour universel et l'individualisme intégral: les maîtres Mo Tsé et Yang Tchou1972 Le sortilège du mystère; Faits étranges et gens bizarres rencontrés au long de mes routes d'orient et d'occident1975 Vivre au Tibet; Cuisine, traditions et images1975 Journal de voyage; Lettres à son Mari, 11 août 1904 – 27 décembre 1917. Vol. 1. Ed. Marie-Madeleine Peyronnet
1976 Journal de voyage; Lettres à son Mari, 14 janvier 1918 – 31 décembre 1940. Vol. 2. Ed. Marie-Madeleine Peyronnet
1979 Le Tibet d'Alexandra David-Néel1981 Secret Oral Teachings in Tibetan Buddhist Sects1986 La lampe de sagesseMany of Alexandra David-Neel's books were published more or less simultaneously both in French and English.

See also
 Atlas, a 1991 opera loosely based on David-Néel's life and writings
 Elise Wortley
 Once Upon a Time... The Explorers Buddhism in France
 Tulpa - creations of mental powers,  David-Néel claimed to have witnessed this in Tibet

 Explanatory notes

 References 
 Citations 

 General sources 

 
 
 
  This book is based on extensive interviews with David Neel's secretary at Digne and reading her letters to her husband, now published as "Journal de voyage: lettres a son mari."
 
 
 

Further reading
 Middleton, Ruth (1989). Alexandra David-Neel. Boston: Shambhala. .
 Norwick, Braham (Autumn 1976). "Alexandra David-Neel's Adventures in Tibet: Fact or Fiction?". The Tibet Journal. Vol. 1, Nos. 3 & 4. , pp. 70–74. .
 Rice, Earl (2004). Alexandra David-Neel: Explorer at the Roof of the World''.

External links 

 Official web site
 A Mystic in Tibet – Alexandra David-Neel

1868 births
1969 deaths
19th-century Buddhists
20th-century Buddhists
Anarcha-feminists
Anti-natalists
Belgian anarchists
Belgian Buddhists
Belgian ethnographers
Belgian explorers
Belgian feminists
Belgian non-fiction writers
Tibetan Buddhism writers
Converts to Buddhism
Explorers of Asia
Explorers of Tibet
Female explorers
Female travelers
French anarchists
French Buddhists
French centenarians
French ethnographers
French explorers
French feminists
French travel writers
French women writers
History of Tibet
People from Saint-Mandé
Belgian women anthropologists
French women anthropologists
Women centenarians
Women mystics
Women travel writers